During the 2007–08 English football season, Preston North End competed in the Football League Championship.

Season summary
After losing key player David Nugent, Preston North End made a bad start to the 2007–08 season with just three victories from the opening 16 matches, which resulted in manager Paul Simpson being sacked on 13 November. Everton assistant manager Alan Irvine took over as manager seven days later and guided Preston to a 15th-place finish.

Final league table

Results
Preston North End's score comes first

Legend

Football League Championship

FA Cup

League Cup

Players

First-team squad
Squad at end of season

Left club during season

References

Notes

Preston North End F.C. seasons
Preston North End